Vítor Manuel Ribeiro Constâncio, GCC, GCIH (born 12 October 1943) is a Portuguese economist and academic who served as Vice President of the European Central Bank from 2010 to 2018. He previously served as Governor of the Bank of Portugal from 1985 to 1986 and 2000 to 2010.

Constâncio graduated in economics from the University of Lisbon, and obtained a master at the University of Bristol.

Since June 2018 he has been a professor at the School of Economics & Business Administration of the University of Navarra.

Career
Constâncio was Secretary of State for Planning in the I and II Provisional Government of Portugal from 1974 to 1975, and Secretary of State for Budget and Planning in 1976 in the IV Provisional Government. He then became Minister of Finance from January to August 1978 in the II Constitutional Government of Portugal, and is therefore until now the youngest Portuguese Finance Minister since the revolution.

Constâncio was secretary-general of the Socialist Party from 1986 to 1989. He lost the legislative elections of 19 July 1987, but remained in office. He resigned the following year, being replaced by Jorge Sampaio.

Constâncio was governor of the Banco de Portugal, the Portuguese central bank, for the first time in 1985–86, having been appointed vice-governor in 1977, in 1979, and in the period from 1981 to 1984.

From 1993 to 1994, Constâncio served as chairman of Lisboa 94, the entity in charge of organizing the commemorative events of Lisbon as European Capital of Culture.

Between 1995 and 1999, Constâncio was a member of the Portuguese Council of State. During the same period, he served as Member of the Board (Executive Director) of Banco Português de Investimento (BPI), a leading private Portuguese banking group, with responsibility for Budget, Accounting and Control of Financial Market Risks. In this capacity, he represented BPI as non-executive member of the board of Portugal Telecom and subsequently as non-executive member of the Board of Energias de Portugal.

Constâncio served once more as governor of the Banco de Portugal from 2000 to 2010, having been re-appointed in 2006. Under his presidency the Bank of Portugal spent one third of its original holdings of 600 tons of gold to 400 tons, approximately.

While in office, he advocated salaries stagnation or increases below inflation, as a way to increase the Portuguese economy's competitiveness. In 2005, Constâncio enraged right-wing politicians when he reviewed the previous conservative government's figures and revised the deficit up from around 3% to 6.8%. Two Portuguese banks (Banco Português de Negócios (BPN) and Banco Privado Português (BPP) had been accumulating losses for years due to bad investments, embezzlement and accounting fraud. The Portuguese Central Bank, led by Constâncio, was criticized for having allowed this situation for years.

European Central Bank, 2010–2018
Constâncio was first mentioned as a potential vice president of the European Central Bank in 2002, to replace Christian Noyer. At the time, he cited family reasons for refusing to run for the post.

Constâncio was eventually appointed vice president of European Central Bank in 2010, for an eight-year mandate. At the time, he was chosen by Eurozone finance ministers ahead of Peter Praet, director of the National Bank of Belgium, and Yves Mersch, the governor of the Bank of Luxembourg, to replace Lucas Papademos of Greece. During his time at the ECB, he developed a reputation as an inflation dove who often emphasised the need for economic growth.

Shortly after, on 6 April 2011, the Portuguese Government, facing increasing difficulties in securing its financing needs in the international financial markets, formally requested international financial assistance leading to a €78 billion program with equal participation of the European Financial Stabilisation Mechanism, European Financial Stability Facility and International Monetary Fund.

In 1968 he married with Maria Jose Pardana , they have one son and one daughter.

Other activities
 Center for Economic and Policy Research (CEPR), Distinguished Fellow (since 2019)
 Financial Stability Board (FSB), Ex-Officio Member of the Standing Committee on Supervisory and Regulatory Cooperation 
 Banco de Portugal, Member of the Advisory Board

References

|-

|-

1943 births
Finance ministers of Portugal
Governors of the Bank of Portugal
Living people
Presidents of the Party of European Socialists
Socialist Party (Portugal) politicians
Technical University of Lisbon alumni
Vice Presidents of the European Central Bank